Talara rufibasis is a moth in the subfamily Arctiinae. It was described by Felder in 1875. It is found in Panama and Colombia.

References

Arctiidae genus list at Butterflies and Moths of the World of the Natural History Museum

Moths described in 1875
Lithosiini